Paw Madsen (born 31 October 1972) is a Swedish-born Danish sprint canoer who competed from the mid-1990s to the mid-2000s (decade). He finished sixth for Sweden in the K-4 1000 m event at the 1996 Summer Olympics in Atlanta. Madsen competed for Denmark in the next two Summer Olympics, but was eliminated in the semifinals of all four events he competed.

References
Sports-Reference.com profile

1972 births
Canoeists at the 1996 Summer Olympics
Canoeists at the 2000 Summer Olympics
Canoeists at the 2004 Summer Olympics
Danish male canoeists
Living people
Olympic canoeists of Denmark
Olympic canoeists of Sweden
Swedish male canoeists